The Australian Liberal Party, also known as Progressive Liberals, was a minor political party that operated in the state of Victoria in the late 1920s.

The party was founded early in 1927 in preparation for the state election to be held later that year. It believed that the Nationalist Party had abandoned liberal principles. An urban-based party, it opposed the rural malapportionment that existed in the Victorian Legislative Assembly at the time. At the election, the party succeeded in electing two of its candidates, Frederick Forrest in Caulfield and Burnett Gray in St Kilda. They were both re-elected in 1929 after withstanding strong challenges from the Nationalists. Forrest died in 1930 and Gray lost his seat in 1932, and the party subsequently faded away.

References

Defunct political parties in Australia
Political parties established in 1927
1927 establishments in Australia
Political parties with year of disestablishment missing